KDK Union is a union parishad situated at Jibannagar Upazila,  in Chuadanga District, Khulna Division of Bangladesh. There are 3 villages and 3 mouzas in the union.

References

External links
 

Unions of Khulna Division
Unions of Chuadanga District
Unions of Jibannagar Upazila